The 1953 NBA World Championship Series was the championship round of the 1953 NBA Playoffs, which concluded the National Basketball Association (NBA)'s 1952–53 season. The Western Division champion Minneapolis Lakers faced the Eastern Division champion New York Knicks in a best-of-seven series with Minneapolis having home-court advantage. By winning four games to one, the Lakers won their fifth title in six years dating from 1948, the club's final season in the National Basketball League.

The five games were played in seven days, beginning Saturday and Sunday, April 4 and 5, in Minneapolis and concluding there on the following Friday. Meanwhile, two mid-week games were played in New York City. The entire postseason tournament spanned 25 days in which Minneapolis played 12 games, New York 11.

Series summary

Lakers win series 4–1

Team rosters

Minneapolis Lakers

New York Knicks

References

External links
 1953 Finals at NBA.com
 1953 NBA Playoffs at Basketball-Reference.com

National Basketball Association Finals
Finals
NBA
NBA
NBA Finals
NBA Finals
NBA Finals
Basketball competitions in New York City
Basketball competitions in Minneapolis
1950s in Minneapolis
1950s in Manhattan
Rose Hill, Manhattan